Hidden Meadows is a census-designated place (CDP) near Escondido in San Diego County, California. The population was 3,485 at the 2010 census, up from 3,463 at the 2000 census.

Geography
Hidden Meadows is located at  (33.229571, -117.124754).

Demographics

2010
The 2010 United States Census reported that Hidden Meadows had a population of 3,485. The racial makeup of Hidden Meadows was 2,865 (82.2%) White, 66 (1.9%) African American, 11 (0.3%) Native American, 318 (9.1%) Asian, 6 (0.2%) Pacific Islander, 93 (2.7%) from other races, and 126 (3.6%) from two or more races. Hispanic or Latino of any race were 329 persons (9.4%).

The Census reported that 3,470 people (99.6% of the population) lived in households, 15 (0.4%) lived in non-institutionalized group quarters, and 0 (0%) were institutionalized.

There were 1,397 households, out of which 279 (20.0%) had children under the age of 18 living in them, 983 (70.4%) were opposite-sex married couples living together, 49 (3.5%) had a female householder with no husband present, 49 (3.5%) had a male householder with no wife present.  There were 53 (3.8%) unmarried opposite-sex partnerships, and 15 (1.1%) same-sex married couples or partnerships. 249 households (17.8%) were made up of individuals, and 129 (9.2%) had someone living alone who was 65 years of age or older. The average household size was 2.48.  There were 1,081 families (77.4% of all households); the average family size was 2.78.

The population was spread out, with 523 people (15.0%) under the age of 18, 209 people (6.0%) aged 18 to 24, 565 people (16.2%) aged 25 to 44, 1,312 people (37.6%) aged 45 to 64, and 876 people (25.1%) who were 65 years of age or older.  The median age was 52.7 years. For every 100 females, there were 97.5 males.  For every 100 females age 18 and over, there were 97.5 males.

The homeowner vacancy rate was 2.6%; the rental vacancy rate was 7.9%.  3,067 people (88.0% of the population) lived in owner-occupied housing units and 403 people (11.6%) lived in rental housing units.

2000
As of the census of 2000, there were 3,463 people, 1,549 households, and 1,149 families residing in the CDP. The population density was 409.6 inhabitants per square mile (158.2/km2). The racial makeup of the CDP was 93.59% White, 0.90% African American, 0.35% Native American, 1.70% Asian, 0.12% Pacific Islander, 1.18% from other races, and 2.17% from two or more races. Hispanic or Latino of any race were 5.86% of the population.

There were 1,549 households, out of which 13.7% had children under the age of 18 living with them, 70.7% were married couples living together, 2.3% had a female householder with no husband present, and 25.8% were non-families. 21.6% of all households were made up of individuals, and 16.0% had someone living alone who was 65 years of age or older.  The average household size was 2.23 and the average family size was 2.55.

In the CDP, the population was spread out, with 12.5% under the age of 18, 3.6% from 18 to 24, 15.1% from 25 to 44, 33.7% from 45 to 64, and 35.1% who were 65 years of age or older.  The median age was 56 years. For every 100 females, there were 92.6 males.  For every 100 females age 18 and over, there were 92.2 males.

The median income for a household in the CDP was $57,545, and the median income for a family was $72,878. Males had a median income of $50,341 versus $32,188 for females. The per capita income for the CDP was $33,274.  About 0.6% of families and 1.5% of the population were below the poverty line, including none of those under age 18 and 0.6% of those age 65 or over.

Government

References

Census-designated places in San Diego County, California
North County (San Diego County)
Census-designated places in California